Manuela Ruben (born 14 January 1964) is a former figure skater who competed in ladies' singles for West Germany. She is the 1984 European silver medalist and three-time West German national champion (1982–84). She placed seventh at the 1984 Winter Olympics and sixth at the 1984 World Championships.

She had hoped to contend for a medal at the Sarajevo Olympics after a strong 2nd place finish at that years European Championships (ahead of the Olympic bronze medalist Kira Ivanova who placed only 4th) but mistakes in both the short and long knocked her out of contention.   The same thing would happen at the 1984 World Championships in a weakened field missing Rosalynn Sumners, Tiffany Chin, and Claudia Leistner.

Results

References

1964 births
Living people
People from Lauda-Königshofen
Sportspeople from Stuttgart (region)
German female single skaters
Figure skaters at the 1984 Winter Olympics
Olympic figure skaters of West Germany
European Figure Skating Championships medalists
World Junior Figure Skating Championships medalists